The Sylva Herald and Ruralite (founded 1926) is a weekly newspaper based in Sylva, North Carolina covering Sylva and Jackson counties. The paper is primarily focused on news and information of local interest with limited space devoted to state and national/world news.

References

1926 establishments in North Carolina
Weekly newspapers published in North Carolina